Parametriotinae is a subfamily of moths in the family Elachistidae.

Genera
Araucarivora Hodges, 1997
Auxotricha Meyrick, 1931
Blastodacna Wocke in Heinemann & Wocke, 1876
Chrysoclista Stainton, 1854
Coracistis Meyrick, 1897
Dystebenna Spuler, 1910
Glaucacna Forbes, 1931
Haplochrois Meyrick, 1897
Heinemannia Wocke in Heinemann & Wocke, 1876
Homoeoprepes Walsingham, 1909
Microcolona Meyrick, 1897
Pammeces Zeller, 1863
Spuleria Hofmann, 1898
Tocasta Busck, 1912
Zaratha Walker, 1864

Former genera
Leptozestis Meyrick, 1924
Trachydora Meyrick, 1897

References

 
 
Moth subfamilies